Michael Charles Trizano (born December 31, 1991) is an American professional mixed martial artist who most recently competed in the Featherweight division of Ultimate Fighting Championship. A professional competitor since 2016, Trizano was the winner of  The Ultimate Fighter: Undefeated season 27 (TUF 27).

Background
Trizano grew up in Ramsey, New Jersey with two younger brothers. Mike joined Tiger Schulmann's martial arts academy at the age of 17. Trizano graduated high school and attended college. It was during this time he realized mixed martial arts was his passion and decided to pursue it full time. Mike Trizano is Italian American.

Mixed martial arts career

Early career
Trizano took his first professional mixed martial arts fight on March 4, 2016. He fought James Gonzalez, and won the fight via unanimous  decision. He went on, winning the next five fights before joining TUF 27.

The Ultimate Fighter
Trizano competed for Team Miocic on The Ultimate Fighter: Undefeated. He was scheduled to face Thailand Clark on the fifth episode of the show, and won the fight via technical knockout in round two. Trizano faced Gunther on June 13, 2018. He won the fight via unanimous decision, and proceeded to face Joe Giannetti in the final of TUF 27.

Ultimate Fighting Championship
Trizano made his UFC debut on July 16, 2018 at The Ultimate Fighter 27 Finale against Joe Giannetti. He won the fight via split decision.

On November 10, 2018, Trizano faced Luis Peña at UFC Fight Night: The Korean Zombie vs. Rodríguez. He won the fight via split decision.

Trizano faced Grant Dawson on May 18, 2019, at UFC Fight Night: dos Anjos vs. Lee. He lost the fight via a rear-naked choke in round two.

Trizano was scheduled to meet Rafael Alves on February 20, 2021, at UFC Fight Night 185. However, on February 9, 2021, news surfaced that he was forced to withdraw from the bout due to an ankle injury.

Trizano faced Ľudovít Klein on May 8, 2021, at UFC on ESPN 24. He won the fight via unanimous decision. 11 out of 14 media scores gave the fight to Klein.

Trizano was expected to face Chas Skelly on October 9, 2021, at UFC Fight Night 194. However, two weeks before the event, Skelly was removed from the bout for undisclosed reasons and the bout was cancelled.

Trizano faced Hakeem Dawodu on February 5, 2022, at UFC Fight Night 200. He lost the fight via unanimous decision. He lost the fight via technical knockout in round three.

Trizano faced Lucas Almeida on June 4, 2022, at UFC Fight Night 207. He lost the back-and-forth bout via TKO in the third round. This fight earned him the Fight of the Night award.

Trizano faced Seung Woo Choi on November 12, 2022, at UFC 281. At the weigh-ins, Trizano weighed in at 147.6 pounds, one and six tenths of a pound over the featherweight non-title fight limit. The bout proceeded at a catchweight with Trizano fined 20% of his purse, which went to his opponent Choi. He won the fight via knockout in the first round. It was annonced in mid-January that Trizano was no longer in UFC's roster as he fought out his contract and was not re-signed.

Championships and accomplishments
Ultimate Fighting Championship
The Ultimate Fighter: Undefeated Lightweight Tournament Winner
Fight of the Night (One time) 
Ring of Combat
Ring of Combat Featherweight Championship (one time; former)
Maverick MMA
Maverick MMA Lightweight Championship (one time; former)

Mixed martial arts record

|-
|Win
|align=center|10–3
|Seung Woo Choi
|KO (punches)
|UFC 281
|
|align=center|1
|align=center|4:51
|New York City, New York, United States
|
|-
|Loss
|align=center|9–3
|Lucas Almeida
|TKO (punches)
|UFC Fight Night: Volkov vs. Rozenstruik
|
|align=center|3
|align=center|0:55
|Las Vegas, Nevada, United States
|
|-
|Loss
|align=center|9–2
|Hakeem Dawodu
|Decision (unanimous)
|UFC Fight Night: Hermansson vs. Strickland
| 
|align=center|3
|align=center|5:00
|Las Vegas, Nevada, United States
|
|-
|Win
|align=center|9–1
|Ľudovít Klein
|Decision (unanimous)
|UFC on ESPN: Rodriguez vs. Waterson
|
|align=center|3
|align=center|5:00
|Las Vegas, Nevada, United States
|
|-
|Loss
|align=center|8–1
|Grant Dawson
|Submission (rear-naked choke)
|UFC Fight Night: dos Anjos vs. Lee
|
|align=center|2
|align=center|2:27
|Rochester, New York, United States
|
|-
|Win
|align=center|8–0
|Luis Peña
|Decision (split)
|UFC Fight Night: The Korean Zombie vs. Rodríguez
|
|align=center|3
|align=center|5:00
|Denver, Colorado, United States
|
|-
|Win
|align=center|7–0
|Joe Giannetti
|Decision (split)
|The Ultimate Fighter: Undefeated Finale 
|
|align=center|3
|align=center|5:00
|Las Vegas, Nevada, United States
|
|-
|Win
|align=center|6–0
|Mike Otwell
|Submission (anaconda choke)
|Bellator 186
|
|align=center|2
|align=center|2:07
|University Park, Pennsylvania, United States
|
|-
|Win
|align=center|5–0
|James Gonzalez
|Decision (unanimous)
|Ring of Combat 60
|
|align=center|3
|align=center|5:00
|Atlantic City, New Jersey, United States
|
|-
|Win
|align=center|4–0
|Eddie Lenoci
|TKO (punches)
|Ring of Combat 59
|
|align=center|2
|align=center|0:34
|Atlantic City, New Jersey, United States
|
|-
|Win
|align=center|3–0
|Tim Kunkel
|KO (punches)
|Maverick MMA 1 
|
|align=center|1
|align=center|0:51
|Stroudsburg, Pennsylvania, United States
|
|-
|Win
|align=center|2–0
|Raul Gonzales
|Submission (rear-naked choke)
|Ring of Combat 55
|
|align=center|1
|align=center|3:59
|Atlantic City, New Jersey, United States
|
|-
|Win
|align=center|1–0
|James Gonzalez
|Decision (Unanimous)
|Ring of Combat 54
|
|align=center|3
|align=center|3:00
|Atlantic City, New Jersey, United States
|
|-

See also

 List of male mixed martial artists

References

External links
 

1991 births
Living people
American male mixed martial artists
American practitioners of Brazilian jiu-jitsu
Featherweight mixed martial artists
Mixed martial artists utilizing Brazilian jiu-jitsu
Ultimate Fighting Championship male fighters
American people of Italian descent